The rescue of Roger Mallinson and Roger Chapman occurred between 29 August and 1 September 1973 after their Vickers Oceanics small submersible Pisces III was trapped on the seabed at a depth of ,  off Ireland in the Celtic Sea. The 76-hour multinational rescue effort resulted in the deepest sub rescue in history.

Submersible and the crew
It was built by International Hydrodynamics of North Vancouver, British Columbia, and had been launched in 1969. Pisces III originally had tail fins, which were removed to improve access and handling when the submersible was purchased by Vickers Oceanics. Ironically, if the fins had been retained they would have prevented the entanglement of the towline on the craft's machinery sphere which caused the 1973 accident.

Pisces III had sunk once before, during trials in Vancouver Bay in 1971. Peter Messervy of Vickers Oceanics, who would lead the rescue team after the 1973 accident, was one of the pilots who were rescued by the Canadian Defense Ministry submersible SDL-1.

The Pisces III submersible was crewed by 28-year-old pilot Roger Chapman, a former Royal Navy submariner, and 35-year-old engineer and senior pilot Roger Mallinson. Chapman had been invalided out of the Royal Navy due to less-than-perfect eyesight. Both men were married.

Accident
During the early hours of Wednesday, 29 August 1973, Chapman and Mallinson began a routine dive, Dive 325 of the Pisces III. Their job entailed an eight-hour shift in the six-foot (1.8 m) diameter submersible which moved along the seabed using water jets to liquefy the mud and lay cable, then cover over the cables.

For Mallinson, this dive was additionally fatiguing as he had spent over a day previously repairing a broken manipulator on the sub. During the repair he changed the oxygen tank for a full one. During each dive the pilots had to ensure that after every 40 minutes they turned on a lithium hydroxide fan to remove carbon dioxide from the atmosphere and also add additional oxygen. Additionally, they maintained a video commentary record during every dive.

Shortly after 9 a.m., with the submersible about to be lifted out of the water with a towline back onto the ship, a water alarm sounded in the aft sphere, a self-contained part of the submersible containing machinery and oil storage. The towline had apparently fouled on the aft sphere hatch and wrenched it open. The crew heard the sound of water entering the aft compartment as Pisces III became inverted and began to sink back to the seabed. The aft sphere was fully flooded with over a tonne of water.

At  the submersible jolted to a stop – held at the maximum length of the nylon towline. The crew swung about in the sea currents until the rope snapped. The pilots immediately closed down all the electrical systems which left the sub in total blackness. They also managed to release a  lead ballast weight as they descended.

Initial contact
Using a torch, the crew was able to review their surroundings and also called their mother ship to update them. The full tank of oxygen Mallison had added had a capacity to last approximately 72 hours, but eight hours had already been used, leaving 64 hours.

Mallison and Chapman spent the first few hours sorting out the submersible which was almost upside down. They checked all the watertight doors for leaks and prepared for rescue to come. To preserve oxygen they knew they had to make as little physical exertion as possible, not even speaking. They made themselves as comfortable as possible as high up as they could get to avoid the foul air that sank down.

The pilots had just a single sandwich and one can of lemonade on board. They also decided to allow the carbon dioxide in the air to build up beyond the normal 40 minutes to conserve oxygen, which resulted in lethargy and drowsiness for both men.

Rescue efforts begin

At 10:35 a.m., the support ship Vickers Venturer, then in the North Sea, was ordered to return to the nearest port with the submersible Pisces II aboard (which could be removed and flown to Ireland). Additionally, at midday the Royal Navy ship HMS Hecate steamed to the accident location to offer assistance with special ropes. The US Navy offered a submersible belonging to the US Salvage Department, called a Controlled Underwater Recovery Vehicle (CURV-III), which was sent from California, and the Canadian Coast Guard ship John Cabot left from Swansea.

On Thursday 30 August the Vickers Voyager arrived in Cork at 8:15 and loaded the submersibles Pisces II and Pisces V, which had been flown in overnight. The ship left Cork at 10:30.

At 2 a.m. on Friday 31 August the Vickers Voyager reached the scene and launched Pisces II with a polypropylene rope attached. However, the lifting rope broke free of the manipulator arm and the submersible had to return to the surface for repairs. An attempt made by Pisces V failed to find the crashed Pisces III and returned to the surface after it ran out of power. The relaunched Pisces V had more success and found the crew at 12:44 p.m. However, an attempt to attach a rope failed. Pisces V now remained with the stricken Pisces III. An attempt to send Pisces II down again had to be called off when it suffered a leak.

Even the newly arrived CURV-III aboard the John Cabot was unable to launch due to an electrical fault. Just after midnight Pisces V was ordered to the surface, leaving the men on Pisces III once again alone. They were running out of both oxygen and the lithium hydroxide to scrub the carbon dioxide from the deteriorating atmosphere in the submersible. Both men were cold and wet and suffering from severe headaches.

Rescue
On Saturday 1 September, at 4:02 a.m., Pisces II was launched once more. At 5:05 a.m. it managed to attach a specially designed toggle and polypropylene tow rope to the rear sphere of Pisces III. At 10:35 a.m. the CURV-III managed to fix another rope to the submersible. It was at this point that the crew ate and drank the only sustenance aboard.

At 10:50 a.m. the lifting of the stricken Pisces III began. It caused immense jolting of the submersible which further disoriented the crew. At  the lift was halted to disentangle the CURV-III. The lift was temporarily halted again at  so that heavier lifting cables could be fixed by divers.

At 1:17 p.m. Pisces III finally broke through the surface. Immediately divers scrambled onto the submersible to open the hatch to let air in, but it took them almost 30 additional minutes to do this. When the hatch did open finally, both men found it hard to extricate themselves from the craft after being cramped inside for 84 hours and 30 minutes. It was later determined that there was just 12 minutes of oxygen left aboard Pisces III. Author R. Frank Busby would later comment, "...the crew of PISCES III can be thankful they were not 250 miles, rather than 150 miles from Cork."

In 1975, Roger Chapman published a book, No Time on Our Side, which covered the rescue.

BBC dramatisations
No Time on Our Side, adapted from Roger Chapman's book for Radio Four by James Follett was first broadcast on 2 June 1976. In addition, "Mayday for Pisces III", an episode of BBC One's series Life at Stake was shown 24 February 1978.

Movie adaptation
In August 2013 it was announced that a film depicting the events of the rescue was in development, possibly starring Jude Law and Ewan McGregor. In July 2021, Mark Gordon Pictures acquired the rights to adapt Stephen McGinty's book based on the rescue, The Dive, into a film.

See also
 LR5 – rescue submersible designed by Roger Chapman.

References

Further reading
 

British submarine accidents
Maritime incidents in 1973